Stanislav Voronov (born August 20, 1957) — Lt. Gen. FSB is a Russian artist and member of the Creative Union of Artists of Russia and member of the Union of Artists of Moscow. He currently lives and works in Moscow.

Stanislav Voronov was born on August 20, 1957, in the village of Toury Khorazan of Alikovsky District, Chuvash Republic (RSFSR, USSR).

In 1979 he graduated from the University of Kazan. As the distribution went to work in the Prosecutor's Office of the Chuvash Republic, Acting Assistant Attorney District Attorney Investigation Department of the Prosecutor's Office of the Republic.

Since 1982, the State Security. Within 2 years of military service in Afghanistan.

In 1994-1999 - Minister of Defense of the Chuvash Republic.

In 1999 – 2001 years, is sent to serve in the Investigation Department of the FSB of Russia First Deputy Head of the Department.

In 2001, Stanislav K. - listener higher courses leadership training at the Academy of the Federal Security Service. In 2002 – 2005 years Stanislav Voronov was first secretary at the Russian Embassy in Belarus.

In 2005 – 2007 years, moved to the JSC "Sukhoi Company", the Deputy Director General for Security.

Married, has two children.

Political activity 

Ran for direct nationwide election in 2001 as President of the Chuvash Republic, by a vote took third place, followed by N. Fedorov (1st place) and Shurchanov (2nd place).

Artistic Activity 

 The representative of Impressionism. Member of the Creative Union of Artists of Russia, member of the Moscow Union of Artists.
 The main directions of work: genre scenes and landscapes.
Member of the Russian and international exhibitions.

Awards
 Order "For Service in the Armed Forces of the USSR" third degree
 Gold Medal of the Artists Union of Russia "For contribution to the national culture." 
 Grand Prix winner of the International Assembly of Art «Russian ArtWeek 2010.".

References

Literature
 "Аликовская энциклопедия" (Alikovsky District's Encyclopedia), authors: Yefimov L.A., Yefimov E.L., Ananyev A.A., Terentyev G.K., Cheboksary, 2009, .
 "Это ярмарки краски!" Журнал "Русская галерея XXI век", No. 4, 2010

External links
 Personal Gallery

1957 births
Living people
People from Alikovsky District
Communist Party of the Soviet Union members
Soviet lieutenant generals